The Children and Adoption Act 2006 (c 20) is an Act of the Parliament of the United Kingdom.

The precursors of the Act are:
Parental Separation: Children's Needs and Parents' Responsibilities (Cm 6273), a green paper published in July 2004
Parental Separation: Children's Needs and Parents' Responsibilities: Next Steps (Cm 6452), published in January 2005
The Draft Children (Contact) and Adoption Bill, published on 2 February 2005
The Report from the Joint Committee on the Draft Children (Contact) and Adoption Bill, published on 12 April 2005
The Government Reply to the Report from the Joint Committee on the Draft Children (Contact) and Adoption Bill (Cm 6583), published on 8 June 2005

Section 17 - Short title, commencement and extent
The following orders have been made under this section:
The Children and Adoption Act 2006 (Commencement No. 1) Order 2007 (S.I. 2007/2287 (C. 86))
The Children and Adoption Act 2006 (Commencement No. 2) Order 2008 (S.I. 2008/1798 (C. 76))
The Children and Adoption Act 2006 (Commencement No. 3) Order 2008 (S.I. 2008/2870 (C. 127))
The Children and Adoption Act 2006 (Commencement No. 4) Order 2010 (S.I. 2010/2612 (C. 124))
Children and Adoption Act 2006 (Commencement No. 1) (Wales) Order 2007 (S.I. 2007/733 (W. 65) (C. 31))

See also
Children Act

References
Halsbury's Statutes,

External links
The Children and Adoption Act 2006, as amended from the National Archives.
The Children and Adoption Act 2006, as originally enacted from the National Archives.
Explanatory notes to the Children and Adoption Act 2006.

United Kingdom Acts of Parliament 2006